Chris Grant (born May 9, 1972) is a basketball executive, and was most recently the general manager of the Cleveland Cavaliers.

College
A native of South Lake Tahoe, California, Grant attended the University of San Diego where the 6'10" center played on the men's varsity basketball team, including a year with former Cavaliers coach Mike Brown. He graduated in 1994 with a degree in psychology, also later earning a master's degree in educational leadership from the University of San Diego.

NBA
Grant was hired by the Atlanta Hawks immediately following graduate school. He worked there for nine years, holding several different positions and moved up the ranks, culminating with being named vice president of basketball operations and assistant general manager in 2004. In 2005, he was hired by Danny Ferry to work for the Cleveland Cavaliers. After Ferry's resignation, he was named the new general manager on June 4, 2010.
Grant was dismissed by the Cavaliers on February 6, 2014. On October 14, 2016 it was confirmed that Grant had taken a position with the San Antonio Spurs for a role as a team scout.

References

1972 births
People from Redwood City, California
Living people
Cleveland Cavaliers executives
National Basketball Association general managers
San Diego Toreros men's basketball players